What Did You Expect from the Vaccines? is the debut studio album by English indie rock band the Vaccines. It was released on CD and digital download in the US, and on CD and LP in Europe and the UK, on 11 March 2011 by Columbia Records, entering the UK Albums Chart at #4, going on to become the biggest-selling debut by a band in 2011. Two singles preceded the release of the album which attained generally positive reviews and gold status by May of the same year.

In 2021, the Vaccines released a ten year anniversary edition of the album on pink vinyl limited to 2500 copies.

Singles
The first single from the album, "Wreckin' Bar (Ra Ra Ra)" / "Blow It Up" was released in the United Kingdom on 22 November 2010 through Marshall Teller Records. The single was an unexpected airplay hit in the UK, Australia and Europe, and hit the lower regions of the UK chart. The second single from the album, "Post Break-Up Sex", was released in the United Kingdom on 24 January 2011. The single debuted at number 32 on the UK chart. The third single from the album, "If You Wanna" was released on 20 March 2011, a week after the release of the album. Having first been released as the band's first demo, the single has been re-recorded for the album. The single gained chart success peaking at number 35.

The fourth single from the album, "All in White" was released on 5 June 2011. The fifth single from the album, "Nørgaard", a song about Danish Supermodel Amanda Nørgaard was released digitally on 19 August 2011. The song had previously been available for free as the "Single of the Week" on iTunes. The sixth and final single from the album, "Wetsuit" / "Tiger Blood" was released on 11 December 2011. The single was made available as a double A-side with a new Albert Hammond, Jr.-produced track "Tiger Blood".

Influences
Lead singer and songwriter Justin Young cites I, Jonathan by Jonathan Richman, Milo Goes to College by Descendents and "California Girls" by The Beach Boys as his major inspirations during the writing of this album. In a conversation with music site Atwood Magazine, Young said, "I remember we were petrified of not being able to capture the energy and we worked with (our producer) Dan Grech, who's an amazing producer and mix engineer but hadn't made any particularly energetic or aggressive sounding records, so we were constantly, as a team – Dan included – we were constantly aware of the fact that we might fall short. So we were always going the extra mile".

Track listing
All lyrics written by Justin Young; all music composed by the Vaccines.

Personnel
Justin Young—vocals, rhythm guitar
Freddie Cowan—lead guitar, backing vocals
Arni Arnason—bass guitar, backing vocals
Pete Robertson—drums, backing vocals

Charts

Weekly charts

Year-end charts

References

External links 
 What Did You Expect from the Vaccines? at Amazon

2011 debut albums
The Vaccines albums